Park Circus is a neighbourhood of Central-South Kolkata in Kolkata district, West Bengal, India.

Geography

Police district
Karaya police station is in the South-east division of Kolkata Police.

Karaya Women police station, at the same address, has jurisdiction over all police districts under the jurisdiction of South East Division i.e. Topsia, Beniapukur, Ballygunge, Gariahat, Lake, Karaya, Rabindra Sarobar and Tiljala.

Location
Park Circus is flanked by Entally and Sealdah to its north, Park Street and Chowringhee to its west, Taltala to its north west, Tangra to its north east, Topsia to its east and Ballygunge to its south. It is connected to both Park Street and AJC Bose Road.

Landmarks

It is notable for the following landmarks:
 7-Point Crossing: One of the major crossings of Kolkata connecting Park Street, Kasai Para Lane/Kimber Street, Suhrawardy Avenue, Parama Island Flyover (Maa Flyover) and New Park Street/JBS Haldane Avenue, AJC Bose Road Flyover and Circus Avenue, Sir Syed Amir Ali Avenue and Shakespeare Sarani.
 The Park Circus Connector (also known as New Park Street (Park Circus to 4 no. Bridge) and JBS Haldane Avenue (4 no. Bridge to the Eastern Metropolitan Bypass) is a road that carries a traffic load of about 8,000 vehicles in the morning and evening. Maa Flyover is constructed above the road to make the transport movement faster.
Park Circus railway station is a station on the Kolkata Suburban Railway serving the area.
 Park Circus Maidan:  Park Circus Maidan becomes a focal point during the winter—specially in December and January—as it becomes home to circus companies and kids all over the city flock to the maidan to watch circus. The part of this maidan is called National Congress Park and near road is called Congress Exhibition Road in memory of the important meeting about independence of Indian National Congress at this place.
 Don Bosco School, Park Circus:  Don Bosco School, one of the private schools for Boys, is a landmark of Park Circus.
 Mahadevi Birla World Academy, close to Don Bosco School is one of the private schools for Girls.
 Modern High School for Girls also one of the schools for Girls.
 Our Lady Queen Of the Missions School.
 Calcutta National Medical College and Hospital, also known as Chittaranjan Hospital.
 Institute of Child Health Centre, A hospital for children.
 Lady Brabourne College.
 Quest Mall, one of the largest shopping malls in Kolkata, is located at Park Circus.
 Church of Christ the King is a church located at Park Circus.
 Park Circus is also famous for Durga Pujas - Park Circus Beniapukur, Uddipani and Karaya Park Circus Sarbojonin.
 Park Circus is a Hub of Restaurant in the City, all the major mughlai restaurant of the city has its branches here.
 Aliah University, Park Circus Campus.
 A number of Mosques, Khanqahs and Dargahs, like Ghulam Rasool Masjid, Maulvi Abdul Hameed Masjid, Arathdar Masjid, Bhawan Chaudhary Masjid, etc. The Daira Sharif-e-Quadria situated at 40C, Shamsul Huda Road, Kolkata-17 is a famous Khanqah of Quadria order (the founder of this order is  Hazrat Ghausul Azam) in Kolkata. Pir Sahib of Midnapore, Hazrat Syed Manal Shah Alquadri, the 22nd descendant of Hazrat Ghausul Azam is the Sajjadanashin of this Khanqah. It was founded in 1985.
 Fatima Parish, located near Park Circus, ministering to Christians in and around Park Circus area.
 Begum Ruqaiya park situated at the crossing of Kimber Street, Orient Row and New Park Street.

Restaurants and eateries
 Arsalan
 Elahi Luxury Dining

Notable persons
 Abdullah Abu Sayeed a famous Bangladeshi writer and Professor.
 Leander Paes one of the legends of Lawn Tennis (doubles)

References

External links
 
 

Neighbourhoods in Kolkata